Jansen is a lunar impact crater in the north part of the Mare Tranquillitatis. The diameter is 24 km. It was named after 17th century Dutch optician Zacharias Janssen. It is located to the east-southeast of the crater Plinius. The rim of Jansen is low and narrow, with a notch along the western edge. The interior is relatively level, which may indicate it has been covered by lava. To the south-southwest a small but prominent crater lies on the crater floor, halfway between the center and the rim.

To the northwest of the rim is a rille named Rima Jansen, and to the east are wrinkle ridges in the mare surface. A low ridge runs from near the southeast rim in a southeasterly direction.

Satellite craters
By convention these features are identified on lunar maps by placing the letter on the side of the crater midpoint that is closest to Jansen.

The following craters have been renamed by the IAU.
 Jansen B — See Carrel.
 Jansen C — See Beketov.
 Jansen F — See Cajal.

References

External links

 LTO-60B2 Jansen — L&PI topographic map
 

Impact craters on the Moon